John Jackson Hunt (November 27, 1922 – May 27, 2020) was an American politician who served as a member of the North Carolina House of Representatives from 1973 to 1995.

Background
Hunt was born in Lattimore, North Carolina, he was the fourth and last child of Robert Lee and Alma (née Harrill) Hunt. He graduated from Lattimore High school in 1939. He served in the United States Army from 1943 to 1948 and from 1950 to 1952 and was commissioned a major. He graduated with a bachelor's degree from Wake Forest University in 1943 and with a degree in dentistry from Emory University in 1948. He was a dentist, a farmer, and a building materials supplier. Hunt was a Democrat.

References

1922 births
2020 deaths
People from Cleveland County, North Carolina
Military personnel from North Carolina
Emory University alumni
Wake Forest University alumni
American dentists
Democratic Party members of the North Carolina House of Representatives
United States Army personnel of World War II